María Cristina Arango Vega (15 October 1928 – 15 September 2017) was the  First Lady of Colombia from 1970 to 1974 as the wife of the 23rd President of Colombia, Misael Pastrana Borrero. Arango was also the mother of the 30th President Andrés Pastrana.

Personal life

In 1946, while her father was serving as Ambassador of Colombia to the Holy See, she met Misael Pastrana Borrero, who was working as a diplomat in the embassy. They got engaged that year and married on 24 February 1951 at the Saint Bartholomew School's Madonna Della Strada Chapel in Bogotá. Together they had four children, Juan Carlos, Andrés, Jaime, and María Cristina. She died in Bogota on 15 September 2017 at the age of 88.

See also
First Lady of Colombia

References

1928 births
2017 deaths
People from Bogotá
Pastrana family
First ladies of Colombia